İkinci Nügədi (also known as Nügədi, Nyugedi Vtoryye, or Vtoryye Nyugedy) is a village and the most populous municipality, except for the capital Quba, in the Quba Rayon of Azerbaijan. It has a population of 7,952.

References 

Populated places in Quba District (Azerbaijan)